Bharti Public School is a public school located in Delhi, India. The school was founded by S.L. Batra. The head branch is located at Swasthya Vihar; the branches are at Mayur Vihar (Kondli), Rajgarh.

The school is divided into four sections: the main building, the auditorium and halls, the sports fields and courts, and the managerial areas. The school has an auditorium hall for indoor events and activities, an assembly hall for functions, cricket nets, table tennis hall and badminton, basketball, volleyball and tennis courts. The school provides coaches for aerobics and yoga (compulsory for 8th and below standards).

The students  are divided into four houses: Samta (Strength), Ekta (Unity), Nistha (Dedication), and Ahimsa (Non-violence). A four-story building is the home of the house system. Every floor has 14-16 student rooms plus one staff cabin, plus supplementary rooms like science labs, computer labs and library.

The school is managed by a committee composed of S.Bharti(chairperson), S.Arora (Principal), and R. Batra( administrative officer).

References 
School website

Educational institutions established in 1982
Schools in East Delhi
Schools in Delhi
1982 establishments in Delhi